Seekarajapuram is a village panchayat located in the Walajah taluk of Ranipet district in Tamil Nadu, India.

Villages in Vellore district